BT Sport Score is a weekly television programme broadcast on BT Sport during the football season. The programme updates viewers on the progress of football games in the United Kingdom on Saturday afternoons between 2:45pm and 5pm.

BT Sport Score is hosted by Darrell Currie and Jules Breach. Pundits on the programme include Chris Sutton, Paul Ince, Robbie Savage, Jermaine Jenas, Peter Crouch, Karen Carney and John Hartson. Whilst other co-host Jules Breach gives updates from the EFL, European football, news from social media and Fantasy Football. Mark Pougatch was the original presenter of the programme.

History
For the 2016–17 season BT Sport acquired rights to the Saturday evening Premier League matches and BT Sport decided to launch a new Saturday afternoon schedule and as part of this new line-up BT Sport decided to launch a football scores service. The programme was launched on 13 August 2016.  Prior to the 2016–17 season BT Sport had showed live rugby union coverage in this slot: this coverage is now broadcast on BT Sport 2.

The programme begins on BT Sport 1 after the final whistle of the live lunchtime game has been shown. Most weeks, Mark Pougatch presents with Jules Breach providing EFL and social media updates. Occasionally, Breach presents alongside Jeff Brazier, on weeks where Mark is not present such as the Rugby World Cup. Darrell Currie took over as host for the 2020-21 season.

After 15–20 minutes of build up, the 3pm kickoffs are watched on monitors in the BT Sport studio by a variety of pundits each week. Occasionally, a pundit will cover a Bundesliga or La Liga match from the studio. Peter Walton, among others, provides referee analysis on the key decisions around the grounds. Elsewhere, there are usually around two reporters at Scottish Premiership matches, and at least one at a Vanarama National League match. During FA Cup weekends, BT send out reporters to every game from the third round onwards and will have pundits watching from the studio - FA Trophy matches are also occasionally covered by a reporter as well on select weekends.

See also
Final Score, a similar programme which is broadcast by the BBC
Soccer Saturday, a similar programme, broadcast by Sky Sports
The Goal Rush, a similar programme broadcast by ITV from 2001 to 2003

References

2010s British sports television series
2020s British sports television series
2016 British television series debuts
BT Sport
Premier League on television
Saturday mass media
Sports television in the United Kingdom